Blastobasis aphanes is a moth in the  family Blastobasidae. It was described by Philipp Christoph Zeller in 1877. It is found in Colombia.

References

Natural History Museum Lepidoptera generic names catalog

Blastobasis
Moths described in 1877
Moths of South America
Taxa named by Philipp Christoph Zeller